Charles Anthony Greer (April 4, 1946December 12, 1999) was an American football defensive back in the National Football League. He was drafted by the Denver Broncos in the 13th round of the 1968 NFL Draft. He played college football at Colorado.  U.S. Army basic training at Ft. Gordon, GA, June - July 1969

1946 births
1999 deaths
Players of American football from Atlanta
American football cornerbacks
American football safeties
Colorado Buffaloes football players
Denver Broncos players
Denver Broncos (AFL) players